The 2022–23 Portland State Vikings men's basketball team represented Portland State University in the 2022–23 NCAA Division I men's basketball season. The Vikings, led by second-year head coach Jase Coburn, played their home games at Viking Pavilion in Portland, Oregon as members of the Big Sky Conference.

Previous season
The Vikings finished the 2021–22 season 14–17, 10–10 in Big Sky play to finish in seventh place. In the Big Sky tournament, they defeated Northern Arizona and Southern Utah before losing to Northern Colorado in the semifinals.

Offseason

Departures

Incoming transfers

2022 recruiting class

2023 recruiting class

Roster

Schedule and results

|-
!colspan=9 style=| Non-conference regular season

|-
!colspan=9 style=| Big Sky regular season

|-
!colspan=9 style=| Big Sky tournament

Source

References

Portland State Vikings men's basketball seasons
Portland State Vikings
Portland State Vikings men's basketball
Portland State Vikings men's basketball